Sender Nordlicht is a German children's television series that aired on German TV station ZDF in the late 1970s. It features the Mainzelmännchen, the TV station's popular mascots who are similar to Heinzelmännchen (their name is a pun between Heinzelmännchen and Mainz, the hometown of ZDF) and combines live-action and animation.

Plot 
The evil boss of a pirate TV station located on a ship orders two dim-witted employees of his to kidnap the Mainzelmännchen in order to improve his channel's program.

See also
List of German television series

1977 German television series debuts
1977 German television series endings
German children's animated comedy television series
German-language television shows
ZDF original programming
Television series with live action and animation